In enzymology, an aculeacin-A deacylase is an enzyme that catalyzes the chemical reaction that cleaves the amide bond in aculeacin A and related neutral lipopeptide antibiotics, releasing the long-chain fatty acid side chain.

This enzyme belongs to the family of hydrolases, specifically those acting on carbon-nitrogen bonds other than peptide bonds in linear amides.  The systematic name of this enzyme class is aculeacin-A amidohydrolase. This enzyme is also called aculeacin A acylase.

References

 

EC 3.5.1
Enzymes of unknown structure